Asahel Huntington  (July 28, 1798 – September 5, 1870) was an American politician who served as a  Mayor of Salem, Massachusetts.

Huntington was born in Topsfield, Massachusetts on July 23, 1798.  His father was the Rev. Asahel Huntington, and his mother was Alethea, daughter of Dr. Elisha Lord, of Pomfret, Connecticut. Huntington was the brother of Massachusetts Lieutenant Governor Elisha Huntington.

Huntington graduated from Yale College in 1819.  After leaving College, Huntington commenced his legal studies at Newburyport, and after some interruptions completed them at Salem, Mass., where he was admitted to the bar in 1824.  He continued in practice in Salem until 1851, when he was appointed clerk of all the courts in Essex County; this office he held till his death. He served the State repeatedly in the Massachusetts Legislature, and in the Massachusetts Constitutional Convention of 1853, and in the same year was mayor of the city of Salem. He died in Salem, Mass., after a brief illness, 5 Sept., 1870.

He was married, 15 Aug 1842, to Mrs Caroline (Deblois) Tucker, of Boston, who survived him, with a son and daughter.

Notes

1798 births
1870 deaths
Members of the Massachusetts House of Representatives
Mayors of Salem, Massachusetts
Phillips Academy alumni
Yale College alumni
19th-century American politicians